Ancylosis bonhoti is a species of snout moth in the genus Ancylosis. It was described by George Hampson in 1901. It is found on the Bahamas.

References

Moths described in 1901
Phycitini
Moths of the Caribbean